José Mendonça Bezerra Filho (born 12 July 1966 in Recife) is a Brazilian company administrator and politician, member of Democrats (DEM) political party. He was the minister of Education of Brazil, nominated by president Michel Temer, from 12 May 2016 until 6 April 2018.

References

|-

|-

1966 births
Living people
Politicians from Recife
Democrats (Brazil) politicians
Education Ministers of Brazil